All the Way is a noise album by Growing released in 2008.  It was released by The Social Registry.

Track listing

References

2008 albums
Growing (band) albums